The 76th Regiment Indiana Infantry was an infantry regiment that served in the Union Army during the American Civil War.

Service
The 76th Indiana Infantry was organized at Indianapolis, Indiana and mustered in for thirty days service on July 20, 1862, under the command of Colonel James Gavin, who was temporarily reassigned from his command with the 7th Indiana Infantry.

The regiment mustered out of service on August 20, 1862.

Detailed service
Duty at Evansville, Indiana, and at Henderson, Kentucky, operating against guerrillas and protecting steamboats on the Ohio River until August 20.

See also

 Newburgh Raid
 List of Indiana Civil War regiments
 Indiana in the Civil War

References
 Dyer, Frederick H.  A Compendium of the War of the Rebellion (Des Moines, IA:  Dyer Pub. Co.), 1908.
Attribution
 

Military units and formations established in 1862
Military units and formations disestablished in 1862
Units and formations of the Union Army from Indiana
1862 establishments in Indiana